The 2012 Thomas & Uber Cups Preliminaries for Africa were held in Addis Ababa, Ethiopia, between 22-26 February and  sanctioned by Badminton World Federation and Badminton Confederation of Africa. Nigeria and South Africa was the defending champion in men's and women's team events. This tournament serves as qualification stage for African countries for the 2012 Thomas & Uber Cup.

Medalists

Men's Team

Women's Team

References

External links 
 Thomas Cup
 Uber Cup

Africa Continental Team Badminton Championships
Badminton tournaments in Ethiopia
Thomas and Uber Cups Preliminaries for Africa
Thomas & Uber Cups Preliminaries